Rock the Faces is an EP record by the band The Hong Kong. It was released in 2003.

Track listing 

 "Mazerati" – 3:12
 "Galaxies" – 2:48
 "Birds" – 3:07
 "Rock The Faces" – 3:22
 "Super Collider" – 3:09
 "Disappear" – 1:54
 "All That Empty Space" – 3:08
 "It's On" – 4:02

References
 

2003 EPs
The Hong Kong EPs